This is a list of local authority districts within Greater London, including 32 London boroughs and the City of London. The London boroughs were all created on 1 April 1965. Upon creation, twelve were designated Inner London boroughs and the remaining twenty were designated Outer London boroughs. The Office for National Statistics has amended the designations of three boroughs for statistics purposes only. Three boroughs have been granted the designation royal borough and one has city status. For planning purposes, in addition to the boroughs and City there are also two active development corporations, the London Legacy Development Corporation and Old Oak and Park Royal Development Corporation.

List of boroughs and local authorities

City of London
The City of London is the 33rd principal division of Greater London but it is not a London borough.

See also
Political make-up of London borough councils
List of areas of London
Subdivisions of England

Notes

References

External links
London Councils: List of inner/outer London boroughs
London Boroughs Map

 Boroughs